Björkö (Swedish for "Birch Island") may refer to:

Places
Sweden
 Björkö, Ekerö, a Lake Mälaren island in Ekerö Municipality, Stockholm County, the location for the World Heritage Site Birka
 Björkö, Öckerö, an island in Öckerö Municipality, Västra Götaland County
 Björkö, Haninge, an island in Haninge Municipality, Stockholm County
 Björkö, the southern part of Väddö island in northern Roslagen, Norrtälje Municipality, Stockholm County. (Also a former parish there.)
 Björkö, Västervik, an island in Västervik Municipality, Kalmar County

Finland
 Björkö, Houtskär, one of the main islands of the former municipality Houtskär in the Archipelago Sea
 Björkö (Korsholm), a Kvarken island in Korsholm Municipality, Ostrobothnia
 Björkö, Kumlinge, an island and a village in Kumlinge Municipality in the Åland Islands
 Björkö, Korpo, an island in the former municipality Korpo in the Archipelago Sea

Russia
 The Swedish name for Primorsk, Leningrad Oblast and the Beryozovye Islands in the Leningrad Oblast

History
 The Treaty of Björkö, signed by Nicholas II of Russia and William II of the German Empire in 1905 named after Björkö (Beryozovye Islands)